Dunseith may refer to:
 Dunseith, North Dakota
 East Dunseith, North Dakota
 David Dunseith (1934–2011), British journalist